Rustai-ye Mosteza Afan (also Romanized as Rūstāī-ye Mostez̤a ʿAfān) is a village in Rudbar Rural District, in the Central District of Rudbar-e Jonubi County, Kerman Province, Iran. At the 2006 census, its population was 117, in 26 families.

References 

Populated places in Rudbar-e Jonubi County